The 1999 Hofstra Flying Dutchmen football team represented Hofstra University during the 1999 NCAA Division I-AA football season. It was the program's 59th season, and they competed as an Independent. The Flying Dutchmen earned a berth into the 16-team Division I-AA playoffs as the #3 seed, but lost in the quarterfinals to Illinois State, 37–20. They finished #5 in the final national poll and were led by 10th-year head coach Joe Gardi.

The 1999 season was the last in which Hofstra went by the nickname "Flying Dutchmen." Toward the end of the end of the 1999–2000 academic year, the school decided to change the nickname for their sports teams to "Pride" effective the following school year.

Schedule

Awards and honors
First Team All-America – Giovanni Carmazzi (Walter Camp, The Sports Network, Associated Press, The Football Gazette); Jim Magda (Walter Camp, The Sports Network, The Football Gazette)
Third Team All-America – Michael Rescigno (The Football Gazette); Doug Shanahan (The Football Gazette)
Honorable Mention All-America – Jim Emanuel (The Football Gazette); Steve Jackson (The Football Gazette); Robert Thomas (The Football Gazette)
First Team I-AA Independents – Giovanni Carmazzi, Jim Emanuel, Steve Jackson, Jim Magda, Michael Rescigno, Doug Shanahan, Robert Thomas
ECAC First Team – Giovanni Carmazzi, Jim Magda, Michael Rescigno
ECAC Player of the Year – Giovanni Carmazzi
I-AA Independents Offensive Player of the Year – Giovanni Carmazzi

References

Hofstra
Hofstra Pride football seasons
Hofstra Flying Dutchmen football